Koinup is an image and video hosting service, web portal and online community for virtual world users. It is used both as a photo and video repository platform and as a tool to share virtual world screenshots, photographs and machinima. , it claims to host more than 100,000 items uploaded by its members and reaches about 100,000 visitors monthly.

Centered on the concept of “Share your Virtual Life", Koinup offers a social networking platform for all virtual world inhabitants.

History
Koinup was developed by Koinup Srl, a Brescia, Italy-based company founded in March 2007. The service was launched in September 2007, preceded by a four-month beta period. Initially, the two founders Pierluigi Casolari and Edoardo Turelli served respectively as chief executive officer and chief technical officer. Along with competitors such as gamerDNA, Koinup followed a trend in the social network scenery at that time by building a social network for online games.

Features
Koinup is a free service, allowing members to upload up to 1.5 gigabytes of photo and video content. Currently, Koinup does not offer a paid premium plan. Uploaders can add tags to their entries and create photo or video galleries. Uploaded content can be shared either by embedding web widgets on websites, or by using a set of social media sharing tools.

Koinup also features tools aimed at creating a bridge between virtual worlds and the website. These tools allow users to interact with their Koinup account while they are in virtual worlds. Particularly, members can send postcards directly from the clients to their Koinup galleries without leaving the virtual worlds.

One of the most popular features on the website is the Koinup Places Section. Koinup Places allow users to geotag virtual world locations and upload them on Koinup. This feature creates a user-generated directory of the best places hosted in virtual worlds. According to a recent publication, more than 1,000 virtual places have already been suggested by the Koinup community.

On April 22, 2010, Koinup expanded their service by launching a paid application on the Nokia Store featuring wallpapers of virtual world related image content. With the launch of Metaverse Wallpapers on March 11, 2011 on Apple's App Store, a similar application became available for iOS devices.

Interoperability
One of the main challenges faced by Koinup is the issue of interoperability between virtual worlds.

Right now, the virtual world scene is made up of numerous standalone walled gardens that do not communicate with each other. There are neither standardized tools for moving and sharing the avatar identity from one world to another nor ways to interact with multiple virtual worlds from a single dashboard. In response to this problem, one of Koinup's goals is to allow users to manage both the content and the friends they have in various virtual worlds with a single account.

References

External links
 
 Company Information

Italian companies established in 2007
Internet properties established in 2007
Italian social networking websites
Virtual world communities
Companies based in Brescia